The KN-19 Kumsong-3 is a North Korean surface-to-surface anti-ship cruise missile. The technology is based on the Russian Kh-35. The missile is ground- or sea-launched.

History 
First propaganda videos were released in 2014. A flight test happened in 2015. Missiles and a mobile launcher were presented in 2017.

Technology 
The missile is similar to a Russian Kh-35 subsonic anti-ship cruise missile. The range is not known, but is likely around 130–250 km. A main difference to the Kh-35 missile is the KN-19's mobile launcher with four canisters. The launcher was developed in North Korea. The system is lacking over-the-horizon radar capability.

References 

Korean People's Navy
Surface-to-surface missiles
Anti-ship cruise missiles